Tuzkol is a salt lake in Mendykara District, Kostanay Region, Kazakhstan.

Geography
Tuzkol lies in the Turgay Depression,  to the south of the Kazakhstan–Russia border. Larger Alakol lake is located to the south of the southern shore and Teniz  to the NNW. River Ubagan flows northwards  to the east of Tuzkol's eastern shore. The lake freezes in the winter.

The A21 Highway skirts the lake on its southern part.

See also
List of lakes of Kazakhstan

References

External links
Geographical places in Kostanay Region, Kazakhstan

Lakes of Kazakhstan
Kostanay Region